The flag of Eswatini was adopted on October 6, 1968 after Eswatini (formerly known as Swaziland) gained independence from the British Empire one month before. The design by King Sobhuza II features a black and white shield, with a staff and two spears, on a field of blue, yellow, and red horizontal bands.

History 

The flag is based on the military flag given by King Sobhuza II to the Swazi Pioneer Corps in 1941 to remind them of the nation's military traditions. On 25 April 1967, the day the pledge of oath was taken by the king, the flag was hoisted for the first time. The College of Arms in London registered the flag on 30 October 1967. The first official hoisting of the flag was conducted on this day.

Specifications 

The flag is rectangular with length and breadth in a ratio of 3:2 respectively. The red stands for past battles, the blue for peace and stability, and the yellow for the resources of Eswatini. The central focus of the flag is a Nguni shield and two spears, symbolizing protection from the country's enemies. Its color is meant to show that white and black people live in peaceful coexistence in Eswatini. The flag has five horizontal stripes—two blue stripes at the top and bottom while the center stripe is red. Two thin yellow stripes border the red stripe. On the red stripe is an ox hide combat shield from the traditional Swazi Emasotsha Regiment, laid horizontally. The shield is reinforced by a staff from which hangs injobo tassels—bunches of feathers of the widowbird and the lourie. These feathers are used only by the king. Above the staff are two assegais—local spears, a Swazi fighting stick and three royal Swazi ornamental tassels called injobo, which are made from widowbird and lourie feathers. In 2011, the color of the tassels were changed to black to match the widow birds' natural color.

Other flags

References 

Flags of Africa
Flag
Flags introduced in 1968
Eswatini
Eswatini